The second season of 90210, an American television series, premiered in the U.S. on September 8, 2009 and ended on May 18, 2010. The season picks up at the end of summer after the events of last season's dramatic prom party. Rob Estes, Shenae Grimes, Tristan Wilds, AnnaLynne McCord, Ryan Eggold, Jessica Stroup, Michael Steger, Jessica Lowndes, and Lori Loughlin all return as series regulars from season one, while Dustin Milligan was released from his contract for "creative reasons". 

New executive producer Rebecca Sinclair said she felt the show needed a "complete overhaul". She hired new writing staff and had new sets built. She was also quoted as saying, "If Gossip Girl is about youth in New York, I want to [make 90210] about youth in L.A. and Beverly Hills." Sinclair also revealed that she wanted to rely less on cast members from the original Beverly Hills, 90210, though Jennie Garth and Ann Gillespie did return for a limited time.

The first episode was seen by 2.56 million viewers, the most watched episode of the show since January 2009.

Synopsis 
This season follows the same characters as they enter their junior year. It picks up three months after Naomi's prom party was raided by cops, landing everyone there in summer school. Meanwhile Annie is enduring the consequences of the hit and run; she discovers the man died and his nephew  goes to West Bev. Over the summer, Ethan left California, and  moved in with his dad in Montana to finish the rest of his high school education there. Having finally moved past Silver, Dixon finds a new girlfriend—but only after telling her a lie about who he really is. Kelly and Silver are informed of some upsetting news regarding their mother. Jen continues to manipulate and exploit Naomi in order to get financial independence. She is still keeping Namoi in the dark about who Liam truly cheated on. Liam has returned to Beverly Hills after spending the summer at Military school, but he has returned with a plan to get his stepfather out of his life once and for all. He also came up with a way to destroy Jen and a way to get back together with Naomi. Teddy Montgomery, a tennis player and the son of a big Hollywood Movie director, and Ivy Sullivan, Surfer, and a daughter of a popular record label enrolls into the school. Deborah and Harry's marriage is on thin ice as the new school year starts.

Cast

Regular
 Rob Estes as Harry Wilson (20 episodes)
 Shenae Grimes as Annie Wilson (22 episodes)
 Tristan Wilds as Dixon Wilson (22 episodes)
 AnnaLynne McCord as Naomi Clark (22 episodes)
 Ryan Eggold as Ryan Matthews (16 episodes)
 Jessica Stroup as Erin Silver (22 episodes)
 Michael Steger as Navid Shirazi (19 episodes)
 Jessica Lowndes as Adrianna Tate-Duncan (22 episodes)
 Matt Lanter as Liam Court (22 episodes)
 Lori Loughlin as Debbie Wilson (21 episodes)

Recurring
 Trevor Donovan as Teddy Montgomery (21 episodes)
 Zachary Ray Sherman as Jasper Herman (17 episodes)
 Gillian Zinser as Ivy Sullivan (14 episodes)
 Sara Foster as Jennifer "Jen" Clark (10 episodes)
 Rumer Willis as Gia Mannetti (10 episodes)
 Blake Hood as Mark Driscoll (8 episodes)
 Kelly Lynch as Laurel Cooper (6 episodes)
 Mekia Cox as Sasha (6 episodes)
 John Schneider as Jeffrey Sarkossian (5 episodes)
 Hal Ozsan as Miles Cannon (5 episodes)
 Diego Boneta as Javier Luna (3 episodes)
 Alex Mckenna as Cat (3 episode)

Special Guest Stars
 Jennie Garth as Kelly Taylor (5 episodes)
 Ann Gillespie as Jackie Taylor (4 episodes)

Episodes

Production

With the reveal of The CW's 2009-10 schedule, it was announced the series would be returning to its original Tuesday 8:00 pm Eastern/7:00 pm Central, as a lead-in to Melrose Place. 90210 is produced by CBS Television Studios with executive producer Rebecca Sinclair.

When Sinclair took over the series, she said she felt the show needed a "complete overhaul" and hired new writing staff, a new producing director, a new DP, built new sets and new wardrobe for all the cast. With the takeover, Sinclair also introduced a new inter title and opening credits, the cast list now appears after the sequence has finished. The premiere was written by Sinclair and directed by Stuart Gillard.

Cast

New executive producer Rebecca Sinclair said that second season will rely much less on original characters Jennie Garth, Tori Spelling and Shannen Doherty to boost ratings. As part of the changes, the season also promotes Matt Lanter as Liam Court from a recurring character from the 16th episode to a regular character, while character Ethan Ward (Dustin Milligan) was released from his contract due to the producers feeling his character had reached its conclusion.

Trevor Donovan was cast as a charming, tennis prodigy and movie star son who is also Adrianna's first boyfriend. Former Law & Order actress Elisabeth Röhm signed on for at least one episode, as a socialite that locked horns with Naomi. Rumer Willis guest starred for several episodes as Gia, a "punky, cute lesbian who isn't afraid to speak her mind." On July 20, 2009, E! Online reported that actor John Schneider had been cast as Liam's plastic surgeon stepfather.

Jennie Garth signed up to return as her character Kelly Taylor. Ann Gillespie also signed on for a multiple episode arc for the character to mend the broken relationship with her daughters.

Gillian Zinser was cast as Ivy Sullivan, a "tomboy surfer chick" and Kelly Lynch was cast as her mother, Laurel Cooper, a former hippie who believes in "free love, the environment, the power of music, legalized marijuana and her daughter Ivy, whom she sees as her greatest triumph". EW's Michael Ausiello announced that former Dawson's Creek actor Hal Ozsan had been cast, in a recurring role, as a faculty adviser for school's paper.
TV Guide confirmed that former Gilmore Girls actor Scott Patterson had been cast to play Jack Court, Liam's ex-con father who opens a tackle shop and would appear in multiple episodes. Ryan O'Neal was later cast to play Spence Montgomery, Teddy's dysfunctional father, in a multiple episode run that started in April 2010. Travis Van Winkle was cast as, Jamie, as "football/frat" student at California University for "several episodes".

Story
The second season focuses on the West Beverly Hills High group as they begin their junior year and go through dramatic changes and surprises that will change their lives. Adrianna's personal life becomes as dramatic as any role she could hope to play; Annie, the good girl from Kansas, is now lost among people she used to trust; Dixon, her brother, struggles to find his own voice; Liam, the troubled New York visitor who abhors the decadent materialistic world of Beverly Hills and Naomi, who is at odds with her sister and soon finds a worse enemy.

Reception 
Season 2 premiered to 2.44 million viewers and a 1.2 Adults 18-49 rating. 90210 was the #1 in the percentage increase for the 18-49 demo between March 22 and March 28, increasing from a 0.7 Live+Same Day rating to a 1.1 rating. DVR ratings for the show sometimes double its broadcast ratings. The second season currently has an average user score of 7.4 out of 10 on Metacritic indicating "generally favorable" reviews. This is a higher average user score than the first season.

DVD release
The DVD release of season two was released after the season has completed broadcast on television. It has been released in Regions 1, 2 and 4. As well as every episode from the season, the DVD release features bonus material such as deleted scenes, gag reels and behind-the-scenes featurettes.

References

2009 American television seasons
2010 American television seasons